Bocșa is a town in Caraș-Severin County, in the Banat region of Romania, with a population of 15,842 in 2011. 

The town is located in the northwestern part of the county,  from the county seat, Reșița. It is traversed by the national road , which connects Reșița to Voiteg, in Timiș County.

Natives
 Nicolae Bocșan
 Vasile Ciocoi
 Sorin Frunzăverde
 Constantin Lucaci
 Roco Sandu
 Sándor Szurmay

Climate
Bocșa has a humid continental climate (Cfb in the Köppen climate classification).

References

Populated places in Caraș-Severin County
Localities in Romanian Banat
Towns in Romania
Mining communities in Romania